Escazú is the second canton in the province of San José in Costa Rica.

The canton lies west of the San José Canton and its whole territory is part of the Greater Metropolitan Area. 

The canton was one of the earliest established in the country, in 7 December 1848. As the metropolitan area has expanded Escazú has become a suburban area on the west side of the national capital city of San José. It is delineated by the Río Tiribí on its northern border. The peak of Cerro Cedral in the Cerros de Escazú marks the southern limit of the canton.

Geography 
Escazú has an area of  km² and a mean elevation of  metres.

Districts
The canton of Escazú is subdivided into three districts (distritos):

 Escazú
 San Antonio
 San Rafael

Toponymy
The name "Escazú" derives from the indigenous word "Izt-kat-zu", which means "resting stone". The story tells of Indians traveling from Aserri (south of San Jose) to Pacaca (near Ciudad Colon), who used to stop and rest at this location, which was about halfway between the two villages.

History
Escazú was first mentioned as a canton in a decree dated 7 December 1848.

The first inhabitants were natives from the Guetaras or Huaca tribes. By 1755, villagers were ordered out of Escazú and moved to San José by force. From 1796 to 1799 the church of San Miguel was built with the cooperation of the people that had already re-established at this site. By 1801 the population of Escazú reached 1,325. On May 28, 1920, the government of Costa Rica granted Escazú the status of City, head of the Canton (County) of Escazú.

It has been suggested that this reputation stems from the perception of Crypto-Jewish traditions since a large number of Conversos were known to have settled in the area.

Landmarks
Local landmarks in the canton include the Costa Rica Country Club, the Multi Plaza Mall, and more recently, Avenida Escazú. These new complexes hold some of the world's most luxurious brands in Multiplaza Mall. Escazú is also home to several diplomatic missions, including the residence of the Ambassador from the United States.

Demographics 

For the 2011 census, Escazú had a population of  inhabitants. 

The canton's urban areas are home to 79.8% of its population. Children under the age of 10 account for 17.88% of the population, while 6.05% are over 65.

According to a 2012 United Nations Development Programme, Escazú ranks as the 4th highest canton in Costa Rica in so far as human development.

Transportation

Road transportation 
The canton is covered by the following road routes:

References

Cantons of San José Province
Greater Metropolitan Area (Costa Rica)